Strange Little Girls  is a concept album released by singer-songwriter Tori Amos in 2001. The album's 12 tracks are covers of songs written and originally performed by men, reinterpreted by Amos from a female point of view. Amos created female personae for each track (one song featured twins) and was photographed as each, with makeup done by Kevyn Aucoin. In the United States the album was issued with four alternative covers depicting Amos as the characters singing "Happiness Is a Warm Gun", "Strange Little Girl", "Time", and "Raining Blood". A fifth cover of the "I Don't Like Mondays" character was also issued in the UK and other territories. Text accompanying the photos and songs was written by novelist Neil Gaiman. The complete short stories in which this text appears can be found in Gaiman's 2006 collection Fragile Things.

As with Amos's previous two studio albums, the cover album was recorded at her Cornwall studio. The album received mixed reviews upon its release in September 2001 with critics largely seeing the album as a mixed bag, praising the unlikely re-workings of Eminem's "'97 Bonnie & Clyde" and Slayer's "Raining Blood", while panning the versions of the Beatles' "Happiness Is a Warm Gun" and Neil Young's "Heart of Gold". Amos also tackled songs by artists such as Tom Waits, the Velvet Underground, Depeche Mode, and the Stranglers.

The album's greatest attention was garnered from Amos's cover of Eminem's "'97 Bonnie & Clyde", a rap song.  The album's cover of "Happiness Is a Warm Gun" was translated into a discussion on the right to bear arms, and included soundbites from both George W. Bush and George H. W. Bush, as well as from Amos's own minister father. The album entered the charts at US No. 4, selling 111,000 copies, making it her third album to debut in the US Top 10, her second-highest debut in terms of sales, and her best position in the US for almost six years.

A planned commercial EP "Strange Little Girl" (originally by the Stranglers), including "After All" (originally by David Bowie) and "Only Women Bleed" (originally by Alice Cooper), was pulled from shelves soon after being shipped to stores in Europe. Despite being recalled from the shelves, limited copies of the single were sold and a promotional video was made.

Additionally, Amos later acknowledged that she had attempted to reinterpret four other songs that she "couldn't find her way into." They were "Fear of a Black Planet" by Public Enemy, "Hoover Factory" by Elvis Costello, "I'm Sick of You" by Iggy Pop and "Marlene Dietrich's Favorite Poem" by Peter Murphy. These tracks have not been released. She also mentioned later in a 2012 interview that, with drummer Matt Chamberlain, she had recorded "Growin' Up" by Bruce Springsteen for this album, but it has also not been released although she has played it live.

Amos received two 2002 Grammy nominations: Female Rock Vocal Performance for "Strange Little Girl", and Alternative Music Performance for the album.

Track listing

B-sides
Like most of Amos' albums, this one also features B-sides on its singles, but this time only two were released.

Personnel
Tori Amos – lead vocals, Wurlitzer, Bösendorfer, Rhodes, ARP
Matt Chamberlain – drums, military drum, taos drums
Adrian Belew – guitars tracks 1, 3, 10, 12; Drill guitar track 5; acoustic guitar and rattlesnake track 6
Justin Meldal-Johnsen – bass guitar tracks 1, 3, 8; "bass painting" tracks 5, 11
John Philip Shenale – music arrangements and performance track 2; strings and synths track 4
Jon Evans – bass guitar tracks 4, 6, 9, 10, 12
Dr. Edison Amos, Daniel Bocking, George W. Bush, George H. W. Bush – voices track 10
M & M – additional guitars, string pads track 6

Charts

Sales

See also 

 Male, a 2015 album by Natalie Imbruglia with a similar concept

References

External links
 

2001 albums
Covers albums
Tori Amos albums
Concept albums
Atlantic Records albums